This is a list of German television related events from 1955.

Debuts

ARD
 26 November - Unheimliche Begegnungen (1955-1957)

DFF
 2 November - Da lacht der Bär''' (1955-1965)

Television shows
1950sTagesschau (1952–present)

Ending this year
 Kinderbücher für Erwachsene'' (since 1954)